The 2020 Atlantic Coast Conference men's soccer season will be the 67th season of men's varsity soccer in the conference.

Clemson are the defending champions of the Atlantic Conference and the Virginia are the defending champions of the Coastal Conference.  Wake Forest are the defending ACC Tournament Champions.

Due to the ongoing COVID-19 pandemic, the season has been significantly modified from previous seasons. The teams were reorganized geographically, and will play a six-game conference season. The season will begin on September 18, 2020 instead of August 28, 2020 and conclude on November 7, 2020.  A modified spring season was also played due to the pandemic.

Changes from 2019 

After 33 years as head coach, Ed Kelly retired following the 2019 season. Bob Thompson was hired as the head coach for Boston College on January 23, 2020.

Impact of the COVID-19 pandemic on the season 

On September 4, 2020 the Atlantic Coast Conference announced the fall Olympic sports schedule, which included the schedule for men's soccer. The men's soccer season will begin on September 18, 2020 instead of the originally planned August 28, and conclude on November 8. The season will culminate with the 2020 ACC Men's Soccer Tournament, which will be reduced to eight teams for the 2020 season only.

On January 26, 2021, it was announced that a spring portion of the 2020 season would be played.  Each team will play five matches in their division.  Divisions would return to the Atlantic and Coastal division, as in previous years.  The winner of the Coastal will play the winner of the Atlantic on April 13.  The winner of that match will play Clemson (winner of the fall season) on April 17 to determine the automatic qualifier for the NCAA Tournament.

Teams

Stadiums and locations 

1.  Florida State, Georgia Tech and Miami do not sponsor men's soccer. Boston College has opted out of participating in the 2020 season due to the COVID-19 pandemic.

Personnel 

Notes
Records shown are prior to the 2020 season
Years at school includes the 2020 season
ACC records include only years with current school.

Preseason

Hermann Trophy 
Due to the ongoing COVID-19 pandemic, a preseason Hermann Trophy watch list was released in January instead of August.  Six players from ACC schools were named to the watchlist.

Preseason Poll 
The preseason poll was released on September 8, 2020.

Preseason national polls 
The preseason national polls were to be released in August and September 2020. Only CollegeSoccerNews.com released a preseason poll due to the COVID-19 pandemic. TopDrawer Soccer and United Soccer Coaches released a preseason poll in February 2021.

Recruiting rankings 
College Soccer News and TopDrawer Soccer release annual recruiting rankings. Below are their respective rankings for the Class of 2020 by program. Ten of the 12 programs earned Top 40 recruiting rankings by College Soccer News.

Preseason awards 

Preseason All-ACC Watchlist

 Kimarni Smith, Senior, Forward, Clemson
 Jack Doran, Graduate, Midfielder, Duke
 Pedro Fonseca, Junior, Forward, Louisville
 Alec Smir, Junior, Goalkeeper, North Carolina
 George Asomani, Senior, Midfielder, NC State
 Jack Lynn, Junior, Forward, Notre Dame
 Edward Kizza, Senior, Forward, Pitt
 Sondre Norheim, Senior, Defender, Syracuse
 Nathaniel Crofts, Senior, Forward, Virginia
 Kristo Strickler, Senior, Forward, Virginia Tech
 Michael DeShields, Senior, Defender, Wake Forest

Fall 2020 regular season 

All times Eastern time.

Week 1 (Sep. 14 – Sept. 20)

Players of the Week

Week 2 (Sep. 21 – Sept. 27)

Players of the Week

Week 3 (Sep. 28 – Oct. 4)

Players of the Week

Week 4 (Oct. 5 – Oct. 11)

Players of the Week

Week 5 (Oct. 12 – Oct. 18)

Players of the Week

Week 6 (Oct. 19 – Oct. 25)

Players of the Week

Week 7 (Oct. 26 – Nov. 1)

Players of the Week

Week 8 (Nov. 2 – Nov. 8)

Players of the Week

Spring 2021 regular season 

All times Eastern time.

Week 11 (Feb. 3 – Feb. 7)

Week 12 (Feb. 8 – Feb. 14)

Week 13 (Feb. 15 – Feb. 21)

Week 14 (Feb. 22 – Feb. 28)

Week 15 (Mar. 1 – Mar. 7) 

Players of the Week

Week 16 (Mar. 8 – Mar. 14) 

Players of the Week

Week 17 (Mar. 15 – Mar. 21)

Week 18 (Mar. 22 – Mar. 28) 

Players of the Week

Week 19 (Mar. 29 – Apr. 4)

Week 20 (Apr. 5 – Apr. 11)

Rankings

Fall 2020

National

United Soccer Coaches

Spring 2021

National

United Soccer Coaches

Top Drawer Soccer

Postseason

ACC Tournament 

Eight teams will qualify for the modified ACC Men's Soccer Tournament.

NCAA Tournament 

On August 13, 2020, the NCAA suspended postseason tournaments for all fall sports. The tournament will be played from April 17 to May 17, 2021.

Awards

Postseason awards 

The Atlantic Coast Conference post season awards were announced on April 14, 2021 and considered both the fall season and spring season.  Some players who were drafted and did not play in the spring season were included on the All Conference teams.

All-ACC awards and teams

MLS SuperDraft 

The 2021 MLS SuperDraft was held on January 21, 2021.  The Atlantic Coast Conference had a record total of twenty five players selected, with twelve first round selections.  This eclipsed the previous record of eighteen total selections, set twice previously.  The twelve first round picks surpassed the previous record of eight first round picks, set in 2016, 2018, and 2020.  The twenty five players selected represented one third of the players taken in the draft.  The ACC also had five players selected in the first five picks, a first in draft history.  Also of note, at least one player was selected from a team that played during the 2020 season.  Only Boston College did not have a player selected and Boston College elected to suspend their season due to COVID-19.

Total picks by school

List of selections

Homegrown players 

The Homegrown Player Rule is a Major League Soccer program that allows MLS teams to sign local players from their own development academies directly to MLS first team rosters. Before the creation of the rule in 2008, every player entering Major League Soccer had to be assigned through one of the existing MLS player allocation processes, such as the MLS SuperDraft.

To place a player on its homegrown player list, making him eligible to sign as a homegrown player, players must have resided in that club's home territory and participated in the club's youth development system for at least one year. Players can play college soccer and still be eligible to sign a homegrown contract.

References

 
Atlantic Coast Conference men's soccer season